The Condor Heroes 95 is a Hong Kong television series adapted from Louis Cha's novel The Return of the Condor Heroes. It was first broadcast on TVB Jade in Hong Kong in 1995. Many of the cast from The Legend of the Condor Heroes (1994) reprised their roles in this series, such as Lau Dan (Hung Tsat-kung) and Wayne Lai (Chow Pak-tung). In addition, Jason Pai reprised his breakthrough role as Kwok Ching, whom he previously portrayed in The Legend of the Condor Heroes (1976) and The Return of the Condor Heroes (1976).

Cast
 Note: Some of the characters' names are in Cantonese romanisation.

 Louis Koo as Yeung Kuo
 Carman Lee as Siu-lung-noi
 Jason Pai as Kwok Ching
 Bonnie Ngai as Wong Yung
 Gigi Fu as Kwok Fu
 Theresa Lee as Kwok Seung
 Gan Pui-wan as Luk Mo-sheung
 Maggie Cheung as Ching Ying
 Lau Dan as Hung Tsat-kung
 Chu Tit-wo as Au-yeung Fung
 Felix Lok as Wong Yeuk-see
 Wayne Lai as Chow Pak-tung
 Gordon Liu as Kam-lun Fat-wong
 Suet Lei as Lei Mok-sau
 Lau Kong as Mou Sam-tung
 Lee Lai-lai as Mou Sam-neung
 Ng Ka-fai as Mou Duen-yu
 Lee Ka-keung as Mou Sau-man
 Ho Kit-san as Yuen-ngan Ping
 Chan Chung-kin as Ye-lut Chor-choi
 Chim Bing-hei as Ye-lut Chai
 Choi Wan-hap as Ye-lut Yin
 Lai Hon-chi as Yat-dang
 Ng Ka-lok as Kwok Por-lo
 Ma Hoi-lun as Lau Ying
 Cheng Lui as Kau Chin-yan (Chi-yan)
 Chan On-ying as Sor-ku
 Lee Kwok-lun as Fung Mok-fung
 Leung Kin-ping as Luk Koon-ying
 Tam Pui-san as Ching Yau-ka
 Yu Tin-wai as Lo Yau-kiuk
 Ho Ho-yuen as Chu Chi-lau
 Waise Lee as Luk Chin-yuen
 Cheung Yin as Ho Yuen-kuan
 Cheung Yik as Kung-suen Chi
 Law Lan as Kau Chin-chak
 Louisa So as Kung-suen Luk-ngok
 Kenneth Chan as Wan Chi-ping
 Lee Yiu-king as Wong Chung-yeung
 Michelle Fung as Lam Chiu-ying
 Kwok Tak-shun as Yau Chui-kai
 Doi Chi-wai as Chiu Chi-king
 Koi Ngok as Lau Chui-yuen
 Suen Kit-hing as Wong Chui-yat
 Choi Kok-hing as Ho Dai-tung
 Law Kwan-chor as Luk Ching-tuk
 Liu Lai-lai as Suen Bat-yee
 Alice Fung as Granny Sun
 Lee Kwai-ying as Hung Ling-bo
 Ben Wong as Kublai Khan
 Wong Chung-hong as Tat-yee-ba
 Lo Chan-shun as Fok-do
 Kwan Ching as Siu-seung-tsi
 Lee Chi-kei as Nai-mo-sing
 Chun Hung as Ma Kwong-chor
 Cheung Hung-cheung as Wan Hak-sai
 Wan Man-ying as Möngke Khan
 Chan Tik-hak as Sa Tung-tin
 Mak Tsi-wan as How Tung-hoi
 Kiu Hung as Pang Lin-fu
 Kong Ngai as Or Chan-ngok
 Cheng Ka-sang as Fan Yat-yung
 Lee Hoi-sang as Fu-muk

External links
 

TVB dramas
1995 Hong Kong television series debuts
1995 Hong Kong television series endings
Hong Kong wuxia television series
Television shows based on The Return of the Condor Heroes
Television series set in the Southern Song
Television series set in the Mongol Empire
Hong Kong romance television series
Sequel television series
Television series about orphans
Cantonese-language television shows